Andrea Collinelli (born 2 July 1969) is an Italian former racing cyclist and Olympic champion in track cycling.

Biography
He received a gold medal in 4000m individual pursuit at the 1996 Summer Olympics in Atlanta.

References

External links
 
 
 

1969 births
Living people
Italian male cyclists
Olympic gold medalists for Italy
Cyclists at the 1996 Summer Olympics
Olympic cyclists of Italy
Sportspeople from Ravenna
Olympic medalists in cycling
UCI Track Cycling World Champions (men)
Medalists at the 1996 Summer Olympics
Italian track cyclists
Cyclists from Emilia-Romagna
20th-century Italian people
21st-century Italian people